This list of environmental awards is an index to articles about notable environmental awards for activities that lead to the protection of the natural environment. The list is organized by the region and country of the organization that sponsors the award. The awards may be open to the global community or limited to a particular country or field of work.

International

Americas

Asia

Europe

Oceania

See also

 Lists of awards
 Lists of science and technology awards

References

Environmental